The 2018–19 Xavier Musketeers men's basketball team represented Xavier University during the 2018–19 NCAA Division I men's basketball season as a member of the Big East Conference. Led by first-year head coach Travis Steele, they played their home games at the Cintas Center in Cincinnati, Ohio. Xavier finished the season 19–16, 9–9 in Big East play to finish in third place. In the Big East tournament, Xavier beat Creighton in the quarterfinals before losing to Villanova in the semifinals. The Musketeers failed to receive a bid to the NCAA tournament, but received an at-large bid to the National Invitation Tournament. There they defeated Toledo in the first round before losing in overtime to Texas in the second round.

Previous season
The Musketeers finished the 2017–18 season 29–6, 15–3 in Big East play to win the Big East championship. In the Big East tournament, they defeated St. John's before losing to Providence in the semifinals. They received an at-large bid to the NCAA tournament as a No. 1 seed in the West region. In the First Round, they defeated Texas Southern before being upset by Florida State in the Second Round.

On March 27, 2018, Chris Mack was hired as the new head coach of Louisville, leaving Xavier after nine seasons. Four days later, longtime assistant coach Travis Steele was named the new head coach of the Musketeers.

Offseason

Departures

Incoming transfers

Recruiting classes

2018 recruiting class

Honors and awards
Street & Smith's Preseason Awards
 All-Newcomer - Ryan Welage
 All-Sharpshooter - Ryan Welage

Roster

Schedule and results

|-
!colspan=9 style=| Exhibition

|-
!colspan=9 style=|Non-conference regular season

|-
!colspan=9 style=|Big East regular season

|-
!colspan=9 style=|Big East tournament

|-
!colspan=9 style=|NIT

Rankings

*AP does not release post-NCAA Tournament rankings

References

Xavier Musketeers men's basketball seasons
Xavier
Xavier